John Peter Richardson II (April 14, 1801January 24, 1864) was the 59th Governor of South Carolina from 1840 to 1842.

Early life and career
Richardson was son of John Peter Richardson and Floride Bonneau Peyre, and grandson of General Richard Richardson of the American Revolution.  He was born on Hickory Hill Plantation in Clarendon County. Richardson was educated at Moses Waddel's School in Willington. He graduated from South Carolina College in 1819 and practiced law upon passing the bar. At the age of 24, Richardson was elected to the South Carolina House of Representatives in 1825 and was known as a Unionist during the Nullification Crisis of the early 1830s. He was elevated to the South Carolina Senate in 1834 and won a seat in Congress as a Jacksonian for the 8th district after the death of Richard Irvine Manning I in 1836. Running as a Democrat, Richardson won re-election for a full term to the Twenty-fifth Congress.

As Governor
By the late 1830s, South Carolina's political leaders grew increasingly anxious about the prospects of the Whigs taking control of the federal government and enacting high tariffs. The only option that they felt available to them was the reconciliation of the factions in South Carolina and to put up a united opposition through the Democratic Party. John C. Calhoun, Robert Rhett and Franklin H. Elmore led the effort to unite the Unionists and the Secessionists and one measure undertaken to reunite the factions was the election of Richardson as Governor of South Carolina in 1840. Nonetheless, extreme secessionists opposed a Unionist being governor and James Henry Hammond entered the gubernatorial race to oppose Richardson. The South Carolina General Assembly followed the lead of Calhoun to end the infighting and Richardson was elected governor.

Richardson's term as governor was marked by the Bank of South Carolina refusing to adopt new banking regulations and the enactment of the Tariff of 1842 by the federal government. He promoted the establishment of the South Carolina Military Academy in Charleston because he felt that the militia of the state should be well educated and trained.

Later life
Upon leaving the governorship in 1842, Richardson remained active in politics by participating at the Southern Convention of 1850, the Southern Rights Convention of 1852 and he signed the Ordinance of Secession at the Secession Convention of 1860. He died in Fulton, South Carolina on January 24, 1864 (about a year before the dissolution of the Confederate States), and was buried at the Richardson Cemetery on Hickory Hill Plantation.

External links 
SCIway Biography of John Peter Richardson II
NGA Biography of John Peter Richardson II
United States Congress Biography of John Peter Richardson II
Find a Grave General Richard Richardson

1801 births
1864 deaths
University of South Carolina alumni
South Carolina lawyers
Members of the South Carolina House of Representatives
South Carolina state senators
Governors of South Carolina
University of South Carolina trustees
Jacksonian members of the United States House of Representatives from South Carolina
Democratic Party members of the United States House of Representatives from South Carolina
Democratic Party governors of South Carolina
19th-century American politicians
People from Clarendon County, South Carolina